The Chairman is a 1969 Jerry Goldsmith album with reworkings of his music for the 1969 spy film, The Chairman, starring Gregory Peck.

References

1969 soundtrack albums
Jerry Goldsmith albums